Guillaume Raskin (16 March 1937 – 16 November 2016) was a Belgian footballer. He played in 20 matches for the Belgium national football team from 1960 to 1964.

References

External links
 

1937 births
2016 deaths
Belgian footballers
Belgium international footballers
Place of birth missing
Association footballers not categorized by position